Xurban collective (stylized as xurban_collective, 2000-2012) was an international art collective founded in 2000. Core members of the group are Guven Incirlioglu and Hakan Topal, whose transatlantic collaborations took the form of media projects and installations. xurban_collective's projects instigate the questioning, examination, and discussion of contemporary politics, theory, and ideology, utilizing documentary photography, video, new media and text. The collective focuses specifically on areas of regional conflicts, military spatial confinement, urban segregation and neoliberal exclusion strategies. In September 2012 xurban_collective members concluded their collaboration to focus on their personal projects, artistic research and production.

Members
Guven Incirligioglu (1960) studied architecture; photography and art theory (Ph.D.) and has exhibited since the 1980s in group shows and has held one person exhibitions in New York, Ankara, Istanbul, Sarajevo, Sofia and other locations working mostly with photography, photo-mechanical materials and new media. Since 1990, he was a lecturer in art and design in various schools in Turkey, including Bilkent University, Ankara, and Istanbul Bilgi University and is currently a faculty member at Economy University's Faculty of Art and Design in Izmir.

Hakan Topal is an artist and scholar living and working in New York City. He is a graduate faculty at the School of Visual Arts’ Fine Arts Department and teaching at the New Media and Art + Design departments at SUNY’s Purchase College. Trained as a civil engineer (B.S.), he continued his studies in gender and women’s Studies (M.S.) and sociology (M.A.). He received his Ph.D. in sociology from the New School for Social Research, New York with a concentration of urban sociology and sociology of arts. His dissertation titled "Negotiating Urban Space: Contemporary Art Biennials, The Case of New Orleans". In 2010, he was the guest editor of the ArteEast Quarterly Journal’s Silence issue, finished a documentary film project on a major late 18th-century Austro-Bavarian sculptor, Franz Xaver Messerschmidt, commissioned by Neue Galerie New York. Topal is working on an upcoming book project about the idea of collateral damage and condolence payments in globalized wars, supported by Prince Claus Fund.

Over the last decade, xurban_collective collaborated numerous other cultural producers, including Ali Demirel, Mehmet Ali Üzelgün, Atif Akın, Elif Akşit, Akın Gülseren, Jillian McDonald, Bülent Öztürk and Mahir Yıldırım.

Exhibitions 
xurban_collective exhibited internationally including projects in institutions such as the 49th Venice Biennial (2001), the 8th International Istanbul Biennial (2003), PS1/MoMA (2005), Apexart (2004), Exitart (2005) and ZKM – Center for Art and Media, Karlsruhe (2004). xurban_collective participated in the "Political/Minimal" show curated by Klaus Biesenbach (MoMA, New York). Most recently, xurban_collective is exbitited at TBA21-Vienna (2010), The National Contemporary Art Museum, Athens (2010) and Arter-Istanbul (2011) and participated in ROUNDTABLE: The 9th Gwangju Biennale, which took place September 7 – November 11, 2012 in Gwangju, Korea.

References

External links
Collective's website
Hakan Topal's website
xurban_collective's position paper on collectivity
Knit++ at Turbulence.org
xurban_collective's selected exhibition archives

Bibliography 
 Topal, Hakan and Incirlioglu, Guven. "The-Sea-Image: Visual Manifestations of Port Cities and Global Waters". New York: Newgray, 2011
 Biesenbach, Klaus. Political/Minimal. Nürnberg: Verlag für Moderne Kunst, 2009.
 Mortenbock, Peter. and Helge Moonshammer. Networked Cultures: Parallel Architectures and the Politics of Space. Rotterdam: NAI Publishers, 2008.
 ACMA. Biennale Del Paesaggio Mediterraneo. Milan: ACMA Centro Di Archittettura, 2008.
 Altindere, Haili., Evren S, eds. User's Manual / Contemporary Art in Turkey: 1986-2006. Istanbul: Revolver Books, 2007.
 Elliot, David. Time Present, Time Past : Highlights from 20 Years of the Istanbul Biennial. Istanbul Modern, 2007.
 Madra, Beral. Neighbours in Dialogue. Istanbul: Feshane, 2007.
 Erdemci, Fulya, ed. Modern and Beyond. Istanbul Bilgi University Press, 2007.
 Biesenbach, Klaus. Greater New York. New York: PS1 / MoMA, 2005.
 Eche, Charles and Vasif Kortun. 9th International Istanbul Biennial. Istanbul Art and Culture Foundation, 2005.
 Conover, Roger. Call Me Istanbul. Karlsruhe: ZKM, 2004.
 Mermoz, Gerard. Time Lines: Reading the City of Signs. Istanbul: Aksanat Center, 2004.
 Cameron, Dan. Poetic Justice: The 8th International Istanbul Biennial. Istanbul: Istanbul Art and Culture Foundation, 2003.
 Akay, Ali. 60 years 60 Artists. Istanbul: Eczacibasi, 2002.
 Madra, Beral, eds. The Perfumed Garden. Istanbul: 49th Venice Biennial Turkish Pavilion, 2001.
 Ronte, Dieter, eds. Under the Sign of the City: Contemporary Art from Turkey. Bonn: Kunstmuseum Bonn, 2001.
 49th International Venice Biennial: Plateau of Humankind. Venice: Venice Biennail, 2001.

International artist groups and collectives
Turkish artists
Arts organizations established in 2000